For computer network security, Stealth wallpaper is a material designed to prevent an indoor Wi-Fi network from extending or "leaking" to the outside of a building, where malicious persons may attempt to eavesdrop or attack a network.  While it is simple to prevent all electronic signals from passing through a building by covering the interior with metal, stealth wallpaper accomplishes the more difficult task of blocking Wi-Fi signals while still allowing cellphone signals to pass through.

The first stealth wallpaper was originally designed by UK defense contractor BAE Systems
In 2012, The Register reported that a commercial wallpaper had been developed by Institut Polytechnique Grenoble and the Centre Technique du Papier with planned sale in 2013.  This wallpaper blocks three selected Wi-Fi frequencies. Nevertheless, it does allow GSM and 4G signals to pass through the network, therefore allowing cell phone use to remain unaffected by the wallpaper.

See also 
 Electromagnetic shielding
 Faraday cage
 TEMPEST
 Wallpaper
 Wireless security

References

External links 
 Azcom: Stealth Wallpaper Prevents Wi-Fi Signals Escaping without Blocking Mobile Phone Signals
 The Register: Wifi Blocking Wallpaper

BAE Systems research and development
Computer network security
Wi-Fi